is a Japanese tokusatsu drama from Tsuburaya Entertainment that aired from July 4 to September 26, 1998 on TV Tokyo. It featured the adventures of a young girl named Asuka Jin who follows in her father's footsteps as Rosetta to battle evil monsters called . The series' motif was that of Ancient Egypt.

Characters
 : Asuka's father who fought the Duat prior to the series.
 : Asuka's mother.
 : One of Asuka's best friends.
 : One of Asuka's best friends

Duat
Demons that existed alongside humans in secret, feeding on them. It's the task of those from the Jin bloodline to combat the monsters and protect humanity.

 : A Duat who bears a grudge on Pharaon for a humiliating defeat decades ago. He obtains the Death Cross Eye to exact his revenge on his rival.
 : A Duat in the form of a young woman whose actions were reported in the newspaper. She attempted to destroy Pharaon for interfering in her feeding by using his daughter as leverage, though Asuka thought Brabat was her father's secret mistress until it was too late. However, Brabat ended up being the first killed by Rosetta.
 : Posed as a model director, he targeted women.
 : Posed as a dominatrix. She kidnapped Asuka and her mother to capture Pharaon, but she ends up fighting Rosetta instead.
 : Posing as a diet-expert, she sold what she claimed to be experimental diet pills to weight-conscious girls. But in reality, the pills were seeds that bloom into flowers within the girls' bodies. They would then be kidnapped by Aginahsa and placed in her "flower garden" for nourishment. Among the victims were three coworkers of a young woman Jin befriend. When said lady went to visit them, Aginahsa uses deception and an aerosol can to kidnap her, force-feeding her seeds. Pharaon attempts to fight her, but he was too tired from searching, and was overpowered until Rosetta arrived to distract the monster so her father can kill her with his Pharaon God Punch attack.
 : Though not a good fighter, he had an advantage in high-jumping moves. Posing as a guitarist, he used his hypnotic power to lure sleeping high school girls to him, feeding on his "cute prey" after liquefying them. His playing attracted Asuka's attention, finding his victims' remains. The next day, Guelygrass gets the half-tired Natsumi and Midori under his spell, with Asuka following. She chases him out and kill him within thirty seconds once he sprains his foot.
 : Assumed the identity of Satsuki, a widowed woman with a thing for younger men. Satsuki attracted these men to her lodge in the middle of the woods, using her charms to make them her "husbands", allowing them to live until a new "husband" comes before eating one of them to maintain her beauty. Her latest victim was Ryou, Midori's senpai from middle school. Once Ryou enters her lodge, Satsuki murders Yamamoto in the dead of night before placing Ryou under her spell. However, when Midori uncovered the truth, she attempted to get him out, only to be halted by Katagiri and Tominaga, who were disposed before Satsuki took matters to her own hands, revealing her true form. But though frighten, Midori refuse to give up until she succumbed to the mickey she was given earlier. But Rosetta arrived to save her friend and took over fighting the Duat. Once hit by Rosetta's Endless Illusion attack, Satsuki was overwhelmed by the mirage of being surrounded by men, leaving her open to a fatal blow to the head.
 : A somewhat goofy Duat, she covers corpses with her revival mud to create her personal army of zombies to avenge her race's genocide. However, her recent recruit was Yanaka, an incompetent worker at Jin's company who died. While in the middle of training her army, Yanaka wanders off to fix his mistake and give his final thoughts to Jin. When she found him, Frogel thought Asuka kidnapped him, summoning her zombies to kill her while using Yanaka as a hostage. But Frogel gets hit by Pharaon's shuriken before he and Rosetta finish off the zombies. Frogel tries to fake begging for mercy, but receive the end of God Punch, sending her in the air with Rosetta dealing the deathblow.
 : 13 years ago, a Centipede Majo impregnated its egg into Tsuchida's body. Over time, the egg hatched and assumed the form of Mika Tsuchida, a seemingly sick girl with asthma. As Mika, Handleg befriended Jin while relying on Tsuchida to survive. But once old enough to fend for himself, Handleg revealed his true form after sucking out his foster mother's blood. Pharaon fought Handleg, reluctantly killing the Duat with his bare hands.
  Assumed the identity of a shy attractive girl named Kyoumi Nohara. Using her guise, Echoleanu befriended the ghost of Yuri Nohara who believed Echoleanu was a protector of the forest she loves. When she arrived to the woods, Echoleanu runs off when Jin and Asuka arrive to halt her feeding. The two later fight the Duat until Yuri arrives to save Echoleanu, promising she wouldn't harm humans ever again. This forces Rosetta to hesitate, giving Echoleanu an advantage on Pharaon. But in the end, Rosetta helped her father kill Echoleanu much to Yuri's dismay, who spirited the Duat's body away in disgust.
 : The most human of the Duats, dressed a mime, Mister Balloon could spit acid bubbles, move fast, and claimed himself immortal as long as human desire exists. Using his power, he gives his balloons off to people, along with a note to write down whatever they wish for. Asuka and her friends were among those to get their wishes to come true: Natsumi as a superstar, Midori being Ryou's wife, and Asuka as a mother. However, in the long run, the wishes turn into living nightmares. When they all realized the truth and were cornered by Mister Balloon, Asuka was forced to transform in front of her friends to fight. She uses her Rosetta Queen to distract the Duat long enough for Midori and Natsumi to hold him for the deathblow. Soon after girls shrug off the whole event as just a dream.
  Jō's original duat form before he becomes Majin-Mask Duanubis.
  Posed as a medical room teacher in Asuka's school, killed by Rosetta.

Episodes
: written by Takahiko Masuda, directed by Mitsunori Hattori
: written by Takahiko Masuda, directed by Mitsunori Hattori
: written by Tsuyoshi Koike, directed by Iwao Takahashi
: written by Tsuyoshi Koike, directed by Iwao Takahashi
: written by Atsushi Maekawa, directed by Mikio Hirota
: written by Atsushi Maekawa, directed by Mikio Hirota
: written by Hiroshi Sugano, directed by Mitsunori Hattori
: written by Hiroshi Sugano, directed by Mitsunori Hattori
: written by Katsumasa Shinma, directed by Mitsunori Hattori
: written by Katsumasa Shinma, directed by Kenzo Maihara
: written by Tsuyoshi Koike, directed by Kenzo Maihara
: written by Tsuyoshi Koike, directed by Atsushi Shimizu
: written by Kazuya Hatazawa and Rima Nozoe, directed by Atsushi Shimizu

Music
Opening theme "I FEEL YOU" by D.Shade
Ending theme  by Pamelah

Original Video Production

Music
Opening theme  by Rei Yoshii & Mae Yoshikawa
Ending theme "Cool-Girl" by Rei Yoshii

Staff
 Written by Rima Nozoe
 Directed by Atsushi Shimizu

Cast
 Asuka Jin / Rosetta: 
 Kenichiro Jin / Pharaon: 
 Atsuko Jin: 
 Natsumi Kudō: 
 Midori Fujisaki: 
 Boss Daimonji: 
 Leader Yasuno: 
 Jō / Duanubis:

References
Kamen Tenshi Rosetta Fansite

1998 Japanese television series debuts
1998 Japanese television series endings
Tokusatsu television series
TV Tokyo original programming